Rovina Cai (born 1988) is an Australian artist known for her work in illustrating fantasy.

Recognition
Cai won the World Fantasy Award—Artist in 2019 and 2021, and the 2021 and 2022 Hugo Award for Best Professional Artist; as well, she was a finalist for the 2020 Hugo Award in that category.

In 2016, her illustrations for Margo Lanagan's Tintinnabula earned her the Crichton Award for Children's Book Illustration.

Education
Cai has an MFA in Illustration from the School of Visual Arts.

References

External links
Official site

School of Visual Arts alumni
1988 births
Australian artists
World Fantasy Award-winning artists
Fantasy artists
Hugo Award-winning artists
Living people